Chatchawit Techarukpong (also known as Victor, born 22 March 1992) is a Thai actor. He is known for his main roles as Terk in GMMTV's Room Alone 401-410 (2014), as Min in Water Boyy: The Series (2017) and as Teacher Pom in The Gifted (2018).

Early life 
Chatchawit was born in Prachuap Khiri Khan Province, Thailand to a Taiwanese father and a Chinese mother.

Career 
Chatchawit started in the entertainment industry by auditioning in several singing competitions such as Teen Superstar under the name TS3 Victor, The Star and Academy Fantasia. Although he did not make it in the said competitions, he was eventually given the opportunity to fulfill his dream to be a singer after signing up with GMMTV and releasing the songs "เราเลือกความรักได้เสมอ" (Rao Leuak Kwahm Ruk Dai Samur), the OST for Room Alone 401-410 (2014), and "กอดสุดท้าย" (Kot Sutthai).

In 2015, he was tapped to host several television programs such as Proteen together with Jumpol Adulkittiporn (Off), Oishi Hitz List and as a backstage host for Asia's Got Talent, Season 1 on Channel 3. He also played main roles in Ugly Duckling: Don't (2015), U-Prince Series: Badass Baker (2016), Water Boyy: The Series (2017) and The Gifted (2018).

He was one of hosts of School Rangers until its 50th episode in 2018 and was replaced by Nawat Phumphotingam (White). He currently hosts the travel television show WOW! Thailand.

Filmography

Film

Television

Discography

References

External links 
 
 

1992 births
Living people
Chatchawit Techarukpong
Chatchawit Techarukpong
Chatchawit Techarukpong
Chatchawit Techarukpong
Chatchawit Techarukpong
Chatchawit Techarukpong